Lowshan (also Romanized as Lowshān, Loshan and Looshan; also known as Pol-e-Lowshān and Pul’-i-Loshan) is a city in the Central District of Rudbar County, Gilan Province, northern Iran.

It is located on the Shahrood river in the Alborz (Elburz) mountain range.

At the 2006 census, its population was 14,596, in 3,584 families.In the beginning of the 13th century, Shamlu clan from Bigdeli tribe lived in Lowshan village of Tarom. Both Lowšān and Manjil had a mainly Turkish population from the ʿAmmārlu tribe, together with Tats and Kurds, and belonged to the ʿAmmārlu district.

References

External links

 Lowshan.com — scientific and cultural Website.

Cities in Gilan Province
Populated places in Rudbar County
Settled areas of Elburz